Quinn Wolcott (born June 17, 1986) is an American umpire in Major League Baseball. He wears number 81.

Before the Major Leagues, Wolcott worked in the Northwest (2006), Midwest (2007), Carolina (2007-2008), Southern (2009-2010), and Pacific Coast Leagues (2011-2012).

Early years 
At Emerald Ridge High School in Puyallup, Washington, Wolcott played baseball and officiated local high school football games.  He also played euphonium for the concert band, winning a regional solo contest for his performance. After graduating from Emerald Ridge in 2005, Wolcott initially enrolled in Pierce College, but decided to attend umpiring school instead.

Career 
Wolcott attended the Jim Evans Academy for Professional Umpiring in 2006, and at the age of 19 subsequently was the youngest umpire hired to the minor leagues that year. He made his Major League debut on May 27, 2013, working both games of a doubleheader between the Arizona Diamondbacks and Texas Rangers.

Wolcott was hired to the full-time Major League umpire roster on July 4, 2014, to replace Gary Darling, who had retired. At the age of 28, Wolcott was the youngest Major League umpire on the roster.

Wolcott's first postseason assignment was the 2016 National League Wild Card Game between the San Francisco Giants and New York Mets.

On September 14, 2017, Wolcott initiated a minor controversy by hinting that Detroit Tigers pitcher Buck Farmer and catcher  John Hicks might have conspired to hit him intentionally after a controversial call that got then manager Brad Ausmus ejected. However, the MLB found no solid evidence to back up that claim.

See also
 List of Major League Baseball umpires

References

Further reading

External links
 Career statistics and umpiring information from Retrosheet
MLB Profile
Umpire Ejection Fantasy League Profile

1986 births
Living people
Sportspeople from Puyallup, Washington
Major League Baseball umpires